Xylosma obovata is a species of flowering plant in the family Salicaceae. It is endemic to Colombia.

References

obovata
Endemic flora of Colombia
Endangered plants
Taxonomy articles created by Polbot